Rere may refer to:

 Really (album), by JJ Cale
 Really (TV channel)
Really, a 2006 film starring Philip Arditti
Really, a 2000 album by David Huff
"Really", a 2018 song by Blackpink from Square Up

Places 
 Rere, Chile
 Rere, New Zealand

Other uses 

 RERE, a gene 
 Rère, a river of France
 Rere language, spoken in Sudan